Ivan Jean-Marie (born 28 September 1972) is a retired athlete from Saint Lucia

Jean-Marie was part of the first ever team to represent Saint Lucia at the Olympic Games when he competed at the 1996 Summer Olympic Games in the 400 metres and the 4 x 100 metres relay. He finished seventh in his heat in the 400 metres and the relay team finished fifth in their heat so he did not advance to the next round in either event.

He still holds Saint Lucian junior records for the 200 metres and 400 metres which he set in 1991, and the senior record in the 400 metres, set in 1995.

See also
 Saint Lucian records in athletics

References

1972 births
Living people
Saint Lucian male sprinters
Olympic athletes of Saint Lucia
Athletes (track and field) at the 1996 Summer Olympics